Vivo Communication Technology Co. Ltd. (styled as vivo) is a Chinese multinational technology company headquartered in Dongguan, Guangdong that designs and develops smartphones, smartphone accessories, software and online services. The company develops software for its phones, distributed through its V-Appstore, with iManager included in their proprietary, Android-based operating system, Origin OS in Mainland China, and Funtouch OS elsewhere. It has 10,000 employees, with 10 R&D centers in Shenzhen, Dongguan, Nanjing, Beijing, Hangzhou, Shanghai, Xi’an, Taipei, Tokyo, and San Diego.

History 
Since its founding in 2009 , vivo has expanded its global market, serving over 400 million users with its mobile products and services, to over 60 countries and regions.” 

In 2017, vivo entered the smartphone market in Taiwan, Hong Kong, Macau, Russia, Brunei, Cambodia, Laos, Sri Lanka, Bangladesh, and Nepal. In June 2017, it entered the Pakistan smartphone market and the vivo brand is currently experiencing rapid growth and popularity in the country. In October 2020, vivo announced that it would begin to sell its products also in Europe.

On 17 December 2020, vivo and Zeiss announced a long-term strategic partnership to jointly promote and develop breakthrough innovations in mobile imaging technology. The first "vivo Zeiss co-engineered imaging system" will be featured in the vivo X60 series. As part of the collaboration agreement, vivo and Zeiss will establish the vivo Zeiss Imaging Lab, a joint R&D program to innovate mobile imaging technology for vivo's flagship smartphones.

In 2021, vivo was ranked among the top 5 smartphone makers, achieving a global market share of 8%.” 

In April 2021, three pallets of vivo phones caught fire at Hong Kong International Airport, prompting a ban on air freight of vivo phones through Hong Kong.

In June 2022, vivo entered the world-famous Guinness Book of Records. It achieved the record for the "Longest Video" in which its flagship device vivo X Fold happened to be folded over 300,000 times for a total length of 270 hours or 11 days and 6 hours.

Marketing 
In October 2015, vivo became the title sponsor of the Indian Premier League (IPL) under a two-year deal starting in the 2016 season. In July 2017, the deal was extended until 2022. However, in response to the 2020 border skirmishes between India and China, the Board of Control for Cricket in India (BCCI) was criticised in India for allowing a Chinese company to be the title sponsor of the league. vivo and BCCI mutually agreed to suspend the deal for the 2020 season, with a clause to resume it next season.

In June 2017, vivo reached a sponsorship deal with FIFA to become the official smartphone brand of the 2018 and 2022 FIFA World Cups. The company also signed a deal with UEFA as an official partner of the UEFA Euro 2020 and UEFA Euro 2024, and became a title sponsor of India's Pro Kabaddi.

vivo has a sponsorship deal with the NBA in China, with Golden State Warriors player Stephen Curry. He endorses the brand in China and the Philippines.

Controversy

IMEI and build number controversy in India 
In June 2020, the cybercrime unit of Meerut Police revealed that more than 13,500 vivo smartphones used in India were running on the same IMEI number. The IMEI number is a 15-digit code meant to be unique to every mobile device communication administration , that may be used for tracking criminals or stolen mobile phones. By using the same IMEI number for multiple devices, vivo could have hampered police tracking of criminals or stolen devices. In 2017, the Telecom Regulatory Authority of India issued a statement that all mobile devices would be required to have a unique IMEI number. Failure to do so would be seen as tampering and could result in a fine or up to 3 years of imprisonment.

The events led to the police filing a case against vivo and its service centre. The lapse reportedly came to light when a police officer gave his mobile phone to the staff at the cybercrime unit for examination, as the phone was not working properly despite being repaired at a vivo service centre in Meerut. The cybercrime unit found that the IMEI number of the device was different from the one printed on the box, and then forwarded the IMEI number to an unidentified telecommunications company providing telecommunications services for the handset and asked for the relevant data. The company informed that as of 24 September 2019, the same IMEI number had been running on 13,557 mobile phones in different states of the country. The Meerut police reportedly handed a notice to vivo India's nodal officer Harmanjit Singh under Section 91 of the CrPC, and also registered a case under Section 420 of the Indian Penal Code.

Tax evasion allegation in India
The Indian government raided the offices of vivo in July 2022 and accused the company of tax evasion. The company allegedly remitted almost half of its turnover out of India. The Enforcement Directorate also blocked the bank accounts of the company to prevent further money laundering. The agency also found that some top executives of vivo who are Chinese had incorporated 23 shell companies in India, with the help of a Chartered Accountant, Nitin Grg. "These (23) companies are found to have transferred huge amounts of funds to vivo India. Further, out of the total sale proceeds of Rs 1,25,185 crore, vivo India remitted Rs 62,476 crore or almost 50 per cent of the turnover out of India, mainly to China", the ED said in a statement.

Notes

References

External links
 

 
Mobile phone manufacturers
Mobile phone companies of China
Electronics companies of China
Companies based in Dongguan
Electronics companies established in 2011
Chinese brands
Chinese companies established in 2011
Privately held companies of China